The 2018 Hounslow Council election took place on 3 May 2018 to elect members of Hounslow Council in London. This was on the same day as other local elections. The Labour Party increased their majority on the council by gaining two seats from the Conservatives.

Results

Detailed Results

Bedfont

Brentford

Chiswick Homefields

Chiswick Riverside

Cranford

Feltham North

Feltham West

Hanworth

Hanworth Park

Heston Central

Heston East

Heston West

Hounslow Central

Hounslow Heath

Hounslow South

Hounslow West

Isleworth

Osterley & Spring Grove

Syon

Turnham Green

By-elections

Cranford

Hounslow Heath

References

2018 London Borough council elections
2018